Bev is a unisex given name, usually a short form (hypocorism) of Beverly or Beverley. It may refer to:

Women
 Bev Brentnall (born 1936), New Zealand cricketer
 Bev Cains (born 1938), Australian former politician
 Beverley Callard (born 1957), English actress
 Bev Francis (born 1955), Australian retired professional bodybuilder, powerlifter and national shot put champion
 Beverly Gannon (born c. 1949), American chef, restaurateur and author
 Bev Hansen (born 1944), American politician
 Bev Harrell (born 1946), Australian pop singer
 Bev Harris, American writer and activist
 Bev Hartigan (born 1967), English runner
 Bev Nicholson (cricketer) (born 1975), English cricketer
 Bev Oda, (born 1944), Canadian retired politician, first Japanese-Canadian MP and cabinet minister in Canadian history
 Bev Perdue (born 1947), American politician and businessperson, first female governor of North Carolina
 Bev Scalze (1943–2021), American politician
 Bev Smith (born 1960), Canadian women's national basketball team assistant coach and former basketball player
 Bev Wilson (born 1949), Australian former cricketer
 Beverly Yanez (born 1988), American soccer player

Men
 Bev Bevan (born 1944), English rock drummer, original member of The Move and Electric Light Orchestra
 Bev Harrison (born 1942), Canadian politician
 I. Beverly Lake Sr. (1906-1996), American segregationist, jurist, law professor and politician
 Bev Lewis (1906-1986), Canadian politician
 Bev Lyon (1902-1970), English cricketer
 Bev Risman (born 1937), English former rugby union and rugby league footballer and coach
 Bev Shipley (born 1947), Canadian politician

Fictional characters
 Bev Bighead, in the animated TV series Rocko's Modern Life
 Bev Houghton, in the Australian soap opera Number 96
 Bev Tull, in the British drama series Bad Girls
 Bev Unwin, in the British soap opera Coronation Street
 Bev Gilturtle, a box turtle from Littlest Pet Shop: A World of Our Own

English unisex given names
Unisex given names
Hypocorisms